Cola Montano, also known as Nicola Capponi, (born circa 1440 and executed 1482) was an Italian writer and humanist scholar who helped incite the Congiura dei Lampugnani or Conspiracy of the Lampugnani that succeeded in murdering the Duke of Milan, Galeazzo Maria Sforza. While not present at the murder, Cola Montano was captured by the Lorenzo de' Medici government of Tuscany, and hung from a window in the Bargello.

He was born in Gaggio Montano near Bologna. By 1462, he had been named professor of Latin for the public school of Milan. Among his students was Pietro Grassi. But it is also reputed that Cola taught Latin to much of the Milanese aristocracy, including the future Duke Galeazzo himself.

Cola was active in sponsoring printers of various Latin classics, but appeared to have fleeting collaborations with the businesses.

After the murder of the Duke, one of the conspirators, Girolamo Olgiati, rapidly fingered his teacher Cola, as fostering the murder. Cola had not been present in Milan at the time but was in Tuscany. Many reasons have been postulated for Cola's impetus to murder the Duke. Some have pointed that he had a wish to revert Milan to a republic and replicate the Ancient Roman precedents of tyrannicide. Cola, by nature, appears to have been prone to bicker. He apparently had twice been jailed, one for  writing satires about another Sforza tutor and the other time accused of raping a young woman. He is said to have been physically assaulted or publicly whipped by Galeazzo for the former infraction.

Note 

Translated in part from Italian Wikipedia entry.

Bibliography
 Filippo Argelati, Bibliotheca Scriptorum Mediolanensium, Milano 1745, I, pp. 96, 158, 447, 456.
 Francesco Berlan, Cola Montano, due lettere, Milano 1877.
 Gerolamo Biscaro, Panfilo Castaldi e gli inizi dell'arte della stampa a Milano (1469-1472), in Archivio storico lombardo, I (1915), p. 85.
 Tobias Daniels, Umanesimo, congiure e propaganda politica. Cola Montano e l'Oratio ad Lucenses, Roma 2015 (RR inedita 63. saggi).
 Giovanni Fantuzzi, Notizie degli scrittori bolognesi, Bologna 1787, VI, pp. 64-66.
 Cola Montano, studio storico, by 
Girolamo Lorenzi, Milan (1875).
 Emilio Motta, Di Filippo di Lavagna e di alcuni altri tipografi editori del Quattrocento, in Archivio storico lombardo, X (1898), p. 28.
 

1482 deaths
Year of birth unknown
Italian humanists
Executed Italian people
People executed by Florence
Assassins of heads of state
15th-century executions
People from Milan